CIGAR or CIGARS is a mnemonic that refers to a pre-takeoff checklist performed by general aviation pilots.  The mnemonic stands for:

Controls  
Instruments
Gas
Airplane secure
Run-up.

Alternately:

Controls
Instruments
Gas
Attitude
Run-up

Yet another version was used by the U.S. Air Force:

CIGarettes For The Poor Russian Soldiers:

Controls
Instruments
Gas
Flaps
Trim
Prop
Radios
Straps.

References

Aviation mnemonics